Joseph Steven Coleman, also known as Joseph K. Adams, is a game designer who has worked primarily on role-playing games.

Career
As Joseph K. Adams, he is a Los Angeles playwright and minor radio personality.

After Janie Sellers stepped up to be the line editor for the second edition of the SkyRealms of Jorune from Chessex, Joe Coleman was given a free hand to move forward on SkyRealms products as time allowed. Coleman produced supplements such as The Gire of Sillipus (1994) and The Sobayid Atlas (1994) later in the line's history. In its latter days, after the principals decided to pull the license from Chessex, Jorune received some support through a selection of fanzines, including Joe Coleman's Sholari (1993-1995).

In 2003, Joe retired to North Carolina and took back his birth name of Joseph Kessler Adams. He continues to publish to the current day.

References

External links
 Home page
 

American dramatists and playwrights
Living people
Role-playing game designers
Year of birth missing (living people)